Haim Malka (born 18 February 1980) is an Israeli football center back who plays for Maccabi Sha'arayim.

References

1980 births
Living people
Israeli footballers
Hapoel Ashkelon F.C. players
Maccabi Herzliya F.C. players
Hapoel Ra'anana A.F.C. players
Hapoel Ramat Gan F.C. players
Hakoah Maccabi Amidar Ramat Gan F.C. players
Maccabi Sha'arayim F.C. players
Association football defenders
Israeli Premier League players
Liga Leumit players
Israeli people of Moroccan-Jewish descent
Footballers from Ashkelon